Ali Ahmad Bazzi Abu Ryan  (Arabic: علي أحمد بزي) is a member of the Lebanese Parliament. He represents the  Bint Jbeil district of South Lebanon. Year 2000–present.

Ali Ahmad Bazzi is a Lebanese politician and a member of the parliament. Bazzi was born in Burj Hammoud, Lebanon. He received a bachelor's degree in political science and management from the Lebanese University in 1981. Later he obtained his master's degree in business administration from the University of Central Michigan in 1996. He was a teacher in various schools and official schools in Lebanon between 1977 and 1985.

When he was in the United States he had the following duties and tasks: The president of the American Lebanese Cultural Center, a member of the Arab American Institute, and a member of the Arab American Association against the Racial Discrimination in America. He was a teacher in American Schools in the State of Michigan, from 1985 till 1987. He succeeded in many missions in America. He was an employee in the state of Michigan – social services department 1987 till 1991. He was also an employee in the recruitment office in Michigan 1991 till 1993. Moreover, he was a federal employee in the American Labor Ministry 1993 till 2000.

Then, he came to Lebanon to participate in the elections as an MP in the Lebanese Parliament for the district of Bint Jbeil, he succeeded in the elections in five consecutive rounds, and also he has been an MP for Amal Movement in the parliament since the year 2000 until present time.

He is a member of the Liberation and Development Bloc presided by Nabih Berry. He is the first vice president of the Scouts Union of Arab Parliamentarians and Honorary president of Real Madrid Scouts League Club in Lebanon. Moreover, he is a member of the political Bureau of Amal Movement and is assigned by the presidential commission in Amal Movement to ensure the follow up of the files related to the ministries of education, social affairs, health, and education. He is the Head of the Parliamentary Friendship Committee with Austria and Cyprus. Finally, he is a member of the Parliamentary Friendship Committees with: Chili, Greece, European Group, Turkey, Estonia, Britain, Germany, Pakistan, Armenia, the United Arab Emirates.

In addition, he is the representative of Amal Movement and the Liberation and Development Bloc in the parliamentary commission which included various parliamentary blocs and Lebanese Parties, to set a new law for the Parliamentary Elections between 2012– 2017, and he presented the 64/64 proposal. He presented hundreds of draft laws, the main important ones were those related to the equality between the employed Lebanese woman married to a foreigner and the employed Lebanese woman married to a Lebanese man, in order to allow her children to benefit from the social benefits.

He likes writing poetry and has many poetic, theatrical and radio works such as writing the famous radio program Ibn El Balad that was presented by the artist Ahmad El Zein. He likes reading (history and international relations).

See also
 Lebanese Parliament
 List of Lebanese Members of Parliament
 Mohammad Hussein Fadlallah
 Mohammed Baqir al-Hakim

External links
 The Parliament of Lebanon: MP Ali Ahmad Bazzi

1958 births
Living people
Members of the Parliament of Lebanon
Lebanese Shia Muslims
Ali Ahmed
Amal Movement politicians